The Prometheus rocket engine is an ongoing European Space Agency (ESA) development effort begun in 2017 to create a reusable methane-fueled rocket engine for use on the Themis reusable rocket demonstrator and Ariane Next, the successor to Ariane 6, and possibly a version of Ariane 6 itself.

Prometheus is a backronym from the original French project designation PROMETHEE, standing for "Precursor Reusable Oxygen Methane cost Effective propulsion System", and for the Titan Prometheus, from Greek mythology, creator of humanity, and god of fire, known for giving fire to humanity in defiance of the gods.

By 2020, the development program was funded, and is being developed for the ESA by Ariane Group.

The engine is aimed to be reusable with substantially lower costs than traditional engines manufactured in Europe.  The cost goal is to manufacture the Prometheus engine at one-tenth the cost of the Ariane 5's first-stage engine.

General characteristics 
The engine is planned to have the following features:
 Methane–oxygen propellant.
 Extensive use of metal 3D printing (up to 50% of the engine).
 Open gas-generator cycle.
 980 kN of thrust (~100 tonnes), variable from 30% to 110% thrust.
  chamber pressure.
 360 s specific impulse (I).
 Reusable 3 to 5 times.
 Around 1 million euros production cost.

History  
The European Space Agency (ESA) began funding Prometheus engine development in June 2017 with  provided through the Future Launchers Preparatory Programme, 63% of which coming from France.

By June 2017, Patrick Bonguet, lead of the Ariane 6 launch vehicle program at Arianespace, indicated that it was possible the Prometheus engine could find a use on a future version of the expendable Ariane 6 launcher. In this scenario, a "streamlined version of Vulcain rocket engine called Vulcain 2.1 would have the same performance as Vulcain 2". The expendable Ariane 6 was then expected to make an initial launch in 2020.

By June 2020, the ESA was on board with this plan and had agreed to completely fund the development of the Prometheus precursor engine to bring the "engine design to a technical maturity suitable for industry". The objective of the overall program as stated in June 2020 was to utilize Prometheus technology to eventually "lower the cost of production by a factor of ten of the current main stage Ariane 5 Vulcain 2 engine".

See also
 Future Launchers Preparatory Programme
 CALLISTO
 Themis programme
 Ariane Next

References

External links 
ESA Prometheus website

Rocket engines using methane propellant
Space programs
European space programmes
Spaceflight technology